Harriet Lane is a British writer, author of Alys, Always and Her. Her journalism has appeared in the Observer, the Guardian, Vogue and Tatler.

Life and career

In April 2008, Lane began having problems with her sight. She now has no sight in her left eye and problems with her peripheral vision in her right.

Lane's first novel, Alys, Always, is a psychological thriller and was published in 2012. She began working on the novel after she took a break from journalism due to her problems with her sight. Lane's second novel, Her, was published in 2014 and is also a psychological thriller.

Bibliography

References

Year of birth missing (living people)
Living people
English women novelists
Place of birth missing (living people)
English thriller writers
English journalists
English women non-fiction writers